Edward Hubert Lee (born December 17, 1961) is an American former professional ice hockey player who played two games in the National Hockey League with the Quebec Nordiques during the 1984–85 season.

Career 
Lee played for the Quebec Nordiques and was traded to the Minnesota North Stars in 1985. He also played for the Fredericton Express and Springfield Indians in the American Hockey League.

In 1987, he moved to Germany and joined ESC Ahaus of the Oberliga. The next season (1988–89) the ESC Ahaus was demoted by request to the NRW Liga (two leagues lower). Lee left the club early before the end of this season because of personal reasons and went back to the U.S.

Career statistics

Regular season and playoffs

International

References

External links
 

1961 births
Living people
American men's ice hockey forwards
Fredericton Express players
Ice hockey players from Rhode Island
People from Bristol, Rhode Island
Quebec Nordiques draft picks
Quebec Nordiques players
Princeton Tigers men's ice hockey players
Springfield Indians players